Men's 400m races for amputee athletes at the 2004 Summer Paralympics were held in the Athens Olympic Stadium from 21 to 23 September. Events were held in two disability classes.

T44

The T44 event consisted of 2 heats and a final. It was won by Danny Andrews, representing .

1st Round

Heat 1
22 Sept. 2004, 10:35

Heat 2
22 Sept. 2004, 10:42

Final Round
23 Sept. 2004, 18:30

T46

The T46 event consisted of 2 heats and a final. It was won by Antônio Souza, representing .

1st Round

Heat 1
21 Sept. 2004, 10:05

Heat 2
21 Sept. 2004, 10:12

Final Round
22 Sept. 2004, 18:10

References

M